Şihabetdin Märcani (pronounced ; Cyrillic , Arabic , also spelled Shihab al-Din al-Marjani; 1818–1889) was a Tatar Turkic Hanafi Maturidi theologian and historian.

He studied in madrassas of Tashkichu (near Kazan), Bukhara and Samarqand. Beginning in 1850 he served as the imam of the First Cathedral Mosque. Later, in 1867, he became a muhtasib of Kazan. At the same time, in 1876-1884 he lectured on religion in the Tatar Teachers' School. Märcani became the first Muslim member of The Society for Archaeology, History and Ethnography at Kazan State University. In his papers he illustrated his ideas about the renovation and the perfection of the Tatar educational system. As a historian, he was the first Tatar scholar to employ a synthesis of European methodology with the traditions of the Oriental scholars. He was the author of more than 30 volumes about Tatar history.

See also 
 List of Hanafis
 List of Ash'aris and Maturidis
 List of Muslim theologians

Notes

References 

Hanafis
Maturidis
19th-century Muslim theologians
Muslim reformers
Sunni Muslim scholars of Islam
Tatar writers
Jadids
Historians from the Russian Empire
Male writers from the Russian Empire
Muslims from the Russian Empire
1818 births
1889 deaths